Sangamon Valley Township is one of eleven townships in Cass County, Illinois, USA.  As of the 2020 census, its population was 330 and it contained 160 housing units.

Geography

Cities, towns, villages
 Chandlerville (west edge)
 Virginia (north edge)

Unincorporated towns
 Cass (historical)
 Jules
(This list is based on USGS data and may include former settlements.)

Cemeteries
The township contains these three cemeteries: Cauby, Powell and Walnut Ridge.

Major highways
  Illinois Route 78
  Illinois Route 125

Rivers
 Sangamon River

Lakes
 Cottonwood Lake

Landmarks
 Panther Creek Conservation Area (west three-quarters)
 Panther Creek State Wildlife Refuge

Demographics
As of the 2020 census there were 330 people, 206 households, and 83 families residing in the township. The racial makeup of the township was 95.76% White, 0.00% African American, 0.30% Native American, 0.00% Asian, 0.00% Pacific Islander, 1.82% from other races, and 2.12% from two or more races. Hispanic or Latino of any race were 4.55% of the population.

There were 206 households, out of which 27.20% had children under the age of 18 living with them, 40.29% were married couples living together, none had a female householder with no spouse present, and 59.71% were non-families. 56.80% of all households were made up of individuals, and 36.40% had someone living alone who was 65 years of age or older. The average household size was 2.40 and the average family size was 4.42.

The township's age distribution consisted of 37.9% under the age of 18, 0.8% from 18 to 24, 22.7% from 25 to 44, 16.4% from 45 to 64, and 22.3% who were 65 years of age or older. The median age was 37.8 years. For every 100 females, there were 84.3 males. For every 100 females age 18 and over, there were 90.7 males.

The median income for a household in the township was $84,167, and the median income for a family was $69,479. Males had a median income of $59,107 versus $14,632 for females. The per capita income for the township was $32,554. None of the population was below the poverty line.

School districts
 A C Central Community Unit School District 262
 Beardstown Community Unit School District 15
 Virginia Community Unit School District 64

Political districts
 Illinois's 18th congressional district
 State House District 93
 State Senate District 47

References
 
 United States Census Bureau 2007 TIGER/Line Shapefiles
 United States National Atlas

External links
 City-Data.com
 Illinois State Archives

Townships in Cass County, Illinois
Townships in Illinois
1923 establishments in Illinois